Choun Chanchav (born 5 May 1999) is a Cambodian footballer currently playing as a midfielder for Phnom Penh Crown in the Cambodian League, and the Cambodia national team.

International career
Chanchav made his senior debut in 2020 AFF Championship against Indonesia national football team on 9 December 2021.

International goals

Honours

Club
Phnom Penh Crown
Cambodian Premier League: 2021, 2022
Cambodian Super Cup: 2022
Cambodian League Cup: 2022

References

External links
 

1999 births
Living people
Cambodian footballers
Cambodia international footballers
Association football midfielders
Phnom Penh Crown FC players
People from Sihanoukville province
Competitors at the 2021 Southeast Asian Games
Southeast Asian Games competitors for Cambodia
21st-century Cambodian people